Ségur-le-Château is a commune in the department of Corrèze in central France.

History
The viscounts of Limoges, also called the viscounts of Ségur created a small principality, whose last heir was Henry IV. Ségur was the main home of these viscounts, in the heart of their domain.

Population

See also
Communes of the Corrèze department

References

Communes of Corrèze
Plus Beaux Villages de France
Corrèze communes articles needing translation from French Wikipedia